Science and technology in the United Kingdom has a long history, producing many important figures and developments in the field. Major theorists from the United Kingdom of Great Britain and Northern Ireland include Isaac Newton whose laws of motion and illumination of gravity have been seen as a keystone of modern science and Charles Darwin whose theory of evolution by natural selection was fundamental to the development of modern biology. Major scientific discoveries include hydrogen by Henry Cavendish, penicillin by Alexander Fleming, and the structure of DNA, by Francis Crick and others. Major engineering projects and applications pursued by people from the United Kingdom include the steam locomotive developed by Richard Trevithick and Andrew Vivian, the jet engine by Frank Whittle and the World Wide Web by Tim Berners-Lee. The United Kingdom continues to play a major role in the development of science and technology and major technological sectors include the aerospace, motor and pharmaceutical industries.

Important advances made by British people

England and Scotland were leading centres of the Scientific Revolution from the 17th century and the United Kingdom led the Industrial Revolution from the 18th century, and has continued to produce scientists and engineers credited with important advances. Some of the major theories, discoveries and applications advanced by people from the United Kingdom are given below.
 The development of empiricism and its role in scientific method, by Francis Bacon (1561–1626).
 The laws of motion and illumination of gravity, by physicist, mathematician, astronomer, natural philosopher, alchemist and theologian, Sir Isaac Newton (1643–1727).
 The discovery of hydrogen, by Henry Cavendish (1731–1810).
 The steam locomotive, by Richard Trevithick (1771–1833) and Andrew Vivian (1759–1842).
 An early electric motor, by Michael Faraday (1771–1867), who largely made electricity viable for use in technology.
 The theory of aerodynamics, by Sir George Cayley (1773–1857).
 The first public steam railway, by George Stephenson (1781–1848).
 The first commercial electrical telegraph, co-invented by Sir William Fothergill Cooke (1806–79) and Charles Wheatstone (1802–75).
 First tunnel under a navigable river, first all iron ship and first railway to run express services, contributed to by Isambard Kingdom Brunel (1806–59).

 Evolution by natural selection, by Charles Darwin (1809–82).
 The invention of the incandescent light bulb, by Joseph Swan (1826–1914).
 The unification of electromagnetism, by James Clerk Maxwell (1831–79).
 The first practical telephone, patented by Alexander Graham Bell (1847–1922).
 The discovery of penicillin, by biologist and pharmacologist, Sir Alexander Fleming (1881–1955).
 The world's first working television system, and colour television, by John Logie Baird (1888–1946).
 The first meaningful synthesis of quantum mechanics with special relativity by Paul Dirac (1902–84) in the equation named after him, and his subsequent prediction of antimatter.
 The invention of the jet engine, by Frank Whittle (1907–96). 
 The invention of the hovercraft, by Christopher Cockerell (1910–99).
 The colossus computer, by Alan Turing (1912–54), an early digital computer (a code breaker in WWII made in Bletchley Park).
 The structure of DNA, by Francis Crick (1916–2004) and others.
 The theoretical breakthrough of the Higgs mechanism to explain electroweak symmetry breaking and why some particles have mass, by Peter Higgs (1929–).
 Theories in cosmology, quantum gravity and black holes, by Stephen Hawking (1942–2018).
 The invention of the World Wide Web, by Tim Berners-Lee (1955–).

Technology-based industries

The United Kingdom plays a leading part in the aerospace industry, with companies including Rolls-Royce playing a leading role in the aero-engine market; BAE Systems acting as Britain's largest and the Pentagon's sixth largest defence supplier, and large companies including GKN acting as major suppliers to the Airbus project. Two British-based companies, GlaxoSmithKline and AstraZeneca, ranked in the top five pharmaceutical companies in the world by sales in 2009 and UK companies have discovered and developed more leading medicines than any other country apart from the US. The UK remains a leading centre of automotive design and production, particularly of engines, and has around 2,600 component manufacturers. Investment by venture capital firms in UK technology companies was $9.7 billion from 2010 to 2015.

Scientific research

Scientific research and development remains important in British universities, with many establishing science parks to facilitate production and co-operation with industry. Between 2004 and 2012, the United Kingdom produced 6% of the world's scientific research papers and had an 8% share of scientific citations, the third- and second-highest in the world (after the United States' 9% and China's 7% respectively). Scientific journals produced in the UK include Nature, the British Medical Journal and The Lancet.

Britain was one of the largest recipients of research funding from the European Union. From 2007 to 2013, the UK received €8.8 billion out of a total of €107 billion expenditure on research, development and innovation in EU Member States, associated and third countries. At the time, this represented the fourth largest share in the EU. The European Research Council granted 79 projects funding in the UK in 2017, more than any other EU country. The United Kingdom was ranked fourth in the Global Innovation Index 2020, 2021 and 2022.

Zero-gravity propulsion, wireless energy transfer, space mining, superconductivity, and smart materials are all vital areas of development for the UK advancing its global position as a producer of technology and establishing its position as a source for it. Nanomedicine is a vital area of research for the NHS as the key to reducing waiting lists is the use of more effective technology.

See also 

 Government Office for Science
 Internet in the United Kingdom
 List of exports of the United Kingdom
 Manufacturing in the United Kingdom
 Telecommunications in the United Kingdom

Notes

References